BOOMERang is a 2021 Russian crime comedy film directed by Pyotr Buslov. It is scheduled to be theatrically released on September 23, 2021.

Plot 
The film tells about Edik, a self-confident, rich and cruel owner of a pharmacy business and an unlucky painter who falls on Edik's car, trying to commit suicide. But a miracle happened, the painter survived and now he must somehow compensate for the damage.

Cast

References

External links 
 

2021 films
2020s Russian-language films
Russian crime comedy films
2021 crime films
2021 comedy films
2020s crime comedy films